The Collector is a Canadian supernatural drama television series about a man attempting to help save people who have bargained their souls with the Devil. The series is set in Vancouver, British Columbia, Canada, where it was also filmed. CHUM cancelled the program after three seasons.

Premise 
After over 600 years of "collecting" the souls of people at the end of their 10-year deals, Morgan Pym (Chris Kramer) negotiates with the Devil for the ability to aid the damned in redeeming themselves rather than sending them to Hell. Under the Devil's mocking gaze, Morgan assists his "clients" in undoing the damage their deals have done because of the devil  shifting good luck towards the client and away from others.

Characters

 Morgan Pym (Chris Kramer) is a collector of souls damned by their deal with the Devil. He was a fourteenth-century German monk who fell in love with a woman named Katrina, breaking his vows. She began to show symptoms of the plague and Morgan sold his soul for her to be cured. The Devil cured her for 10 years, the length of all his contracts. When an angry Morgan confronts him, the Devil claims he didn't cheat on the deal because "You wanted more time with her and I gave you that. You never said she had to outlive you." In return for being spared from Hell, Morgan becomes the first collector. More recently, the Devil agreed to allow him to seek redemption for his clients. Morgan has 48 hours to help redeem each client or they are sent to Hell, and the time remaining is displayed on his cell phone.
 Jeri Slate (Ellen Dubin) is a reporter who regularly encounters Morgan Pym in her investigations and is professionally obsessed with him, as he always seems to be "around" for certain controversial incidents and/or high-profile deaths. But as she digs deeper and gets closer to the truth, she begins to sense a prior, unknown influence of Pym in her own life—which renders the obsession increasingly personal.
 Gabriel Slate (Aidan Drummond) is the son of investigative reporter Jeri Slate. Gabriel, addressed as Gabe in the series, is an autistic child who is somehow connected to Morgan Pym and is regularly visited by the Devil. Some of Gabe's actions influence the stories and he displays an amazing perception of Morgan's experiences. His connection to Morgan is explored progressively throughout the series.
 Taylor Slate (Christine Chatelain) is Jeri's younger sister. She's sweet and smart, but when introduced, seemingly ill-suited for long term responsibility, as she isn't able to hold a job well or reliably for very long. But this "freedom" in her schedule lets Jeri call on her to look after Gabe when Jeri's out pursuing a story. Taylor's aptitude for responsibility is unexpectedly tested, however, when the burden of Gabe's care and upbringing suddenly and unavoidably becomes hers.
 Maya Kandinski (Carly Pope in season 1; Sonya Salomaa in seasons 2–3) used to be a normal child until her father started sexually abusing her at a young age. Eventually she ran away from home and took to the streets of Vancouver, where she became a heroin addict, prostituting herself for the money to buy the drug, and eventually contracted AIDS, which she was dying from when Morgan met her. The first client Morgan tried to save cured her AIDS by inflicting it upon himself, with the Devil's help. Morgan befriends her and helps her with her addiction. It is his meeting with her that makes Morgan decide to make his proposal to The Devil. She bears a great deal of resemblance to Morgan's lost love.
 The Devil is portrayed by a different actor in each episode. To identify him (or her) to the viewer, his eyes appear to fill with fire at times. Gabe is the only person besides Morgan who sees through his disguises. He makes deals with people, granting them whatever they wish, in exchange for their souls in ten years. To do this, he manipulates luck, shifting good luck away from others and towards the client. Therefore, it can be said that nothing The Devil does is truly good, as every action usually has a greater than or equal to negative result or consequence. In the last 48 hours of a deal, the Devil begins to undo the effects of the deal on his client (for example in "The Prosecutor" the client starts losing cases and it is revealed his winning streak was at the expense of innocent people). The Devil's collector will normally approach the client at the 48-hour mark to inform them that they can elect to go to Hell early. The Devil states that either the client gives up and goes to Hell early, or the Devil enjoys watching the client squirm for their last hours on Earth, before he takes them to Hell. In both cases, he 'wins'. In the first episode, the Devil agrees to Morgan's deal, to give souls the chance to redeem themselves during this 48 hour time. He claimed one of the reasons for doing this is that it would make the affair more "sporting". While mocking Morgan's quest and hindering Morgan's efforts, he honors the agreement with Morgan, letting the soul go if it attains redemption.

Series elements

Vow of secrecy 
Morgan and his clients are bound never to reveal the true nature of their situation to anyone else. Revealing the truth to an innocent results in both parties being sent to Hell.

The portal
When a damned soul is about to be sent to Hell, a portal opens up beside them, and the soul is ripped out of the body and sucked into the portal, leaving only the dead body behind. Only a collector and the Devil's clients are able to see this portal. For people who happen to be nearby, the taking of a soul is witnessed as an accident or some other fatal event. Later, it is revealed that the portal can be seen by any person who sold their soul, as a preview of what will happen when their time on Earth is up.

Episodes

Season 1 (2004)
The first fourteen episodes of The Collector, which aired in the summer of 2004 on Space: The Imagination Station and in the fall of 2004 on Citytv.
The Rapper, 2 June 2004: After 650 years of being a collector for Satan, Morgan Pym  decides to try to bring redemption for those who had sold their souls. His first client is a rapper whose fame is the result of his pact with the Devil.
The Prosecutor, 9 June 2004: Successful prosecutor Carter Baine's life is turned upside down when all the cases he won for the past decade start getting overturned. Of course, as Morgan tells him, he didn't ask to make sure the actual guilty parties paid...
The Supermodel, 16 June 2004: Morgan's latest client is fashion model Nicki Schillenberg, who sold her soul to lose weight. Nicki's arrogant, vain, selfish, and rude behavior, however, indicates it wasn't the body that was ugly.
The Ice Skater, 23 June 2004
The Photographer, 30 June 2004: Morgan's new client is Stuart Sanderson, a photographer at the vancouver star who sold his soul to take extraordinary crime photo's.
The Actuary, 7 July 2004: Morgan's newest client is statistician Barrett Gimbal who's been using his devil given powers to help the mafia rub out competition.
The Roboticist, 14 July 2004
The Medium, 21 July 2004
The Old Man, 28 July 2004
The Children's Book Writer, 4 August 2004
The Yogi, 11 August 2004: Morgan's client is a Muslim yogi who sold his soul to achieve enlightenment and pass it on to others. Morgan first has to convince the man that the Devil and his deal are real and then find out where all the bad luck has gone.
The Miniaturist, 18 August 2004
Another Collector, 25 August 2004: Morgan works alongside a collector from Montreal to track down her latest client; a surgeon who traded his soul for the abilities of a psychic healer.

Season 2 (2005)
The Cowboy, 9 January 2005
The UFOlogist, 16 January 2005: Morgan’s latest client is a UFO nut who sold his soul for proof of the existence of aliens.
The Dreamer, 23 January 2005
The Pharmacist, 30 January 2005
The Tattoo Artist, 6 February 2005
The Comic, 13 February 2005: A comedian sold his soul to be the most successful comic in the world. But the joke's on him when his forty-eight hours are almost up.
The Campaign Manager, 20 February 2005:Morgan's next client is the campaign manager of an up-and-coming politician, who wants to hinder his plans to help the poor for her own reasons.
The Mother, 27 February 2005
The Tour Guide, 6 March 2005
The Superhero, 13 March 2005: Ten years ago, a man sold his soul for super powers, only to have great tragedy come with great power. Now his forty-eight hours are almost up, and Morgan must help him.
The Ripper, 20 March 2005: In a flashback episode, Morgan is informed that his next client is none other than Jack the Ripper. But Morgan may be surprised when he finds out the infamous killer's identity...
The Historian, 27 March 2005
Beginnings, 3 April 2005: This episode takes place straight after 1348 AD. Morgan gets to grip with being the first collector and his first ever client; a widower who sold his soul for a good time. We also see how Morgan's tormented by memories of him and Katrina, and how the Devil nearly snuffed out Morgan's humanity completely.
1348 AD, 1 September 2005 (season 1 episode not aired in original run according to TV.com)

Season 3 (2005)
The Jockey, 10 January 2006
The Chef, 17 January 2006
The Customer Service Rep, 24 January 2006
The Vampire, 31 January 2006
The Video Jockey, 7 February 2006
The Farmer, 14 February 2006
The Junkie, 21 February 2006: Maya's brother comes down to go with Maya and Morgan to see Maya get her one month chip. They also meet Maya's sponsor who turn's out to be Morgan's next client. Will Maya finally discover Morgan's secret?
The Watchmaker, 28 February 2006
The Person With AIDS, 7 March 2006
The Media Baron, 14 March 2006
The Spy, 21 March 2006: Morgan is given permission to trail his next client to Eastern Europe; a spy who sold her soul to complete her mission. Morgan ends up tangled up in Espionage in the process.
The Alchemist, 28 March 2006
The Exorcist, 4 April 2006

Home media
Morningstar Entertainment has released the first two seasons on DVD in Canada.  Knightscove now owns the rights. Many of the released DVD sets of both season 1 and season 2 are defective. After a great deal of digging through multiple defective copies, people at Knightscove were able to find a few good copies to replace defective ones.

References

External links
 Official website
 
 Save the Show website

2000s Canadian drama television series
2000s Canadian science fiction television series
2004 Canadian television series debuts
2006 Canadian television series endings
Canadian horror fiction television series
Television shows filmed in Vancouver
Television shows set in Vancouver
Fiction about the Devil